Abbot Beyne School is a comprehensive school in Burton upon Trent in east Staffordshire, England. It was created after the Burton Grammar School was phased out and initially educated the remaining  pupils from  Burton Grammar School and Burton Girls' High School who had been selected at the age of 11 as pupils likely to benefit from a highly academic education.  It inhabited the Grammar School site but as a newly created comprehensive school, did not inherit its educational pedagogy.

Location
It is situated in Winshill, on the other side of the River Trent to the town centre, east of the B5008, near the junction of the A511 and A444 at Burton Bridge.

History

Grammar school
William Beyne, Abbot of Burton Abbey, endowed a grammar school in the early 16th century, functioning sometime around  1531. The boys' Grammar School moved to Winshill in 1957. It was administered by the county borough of Burton upon Trent, and known as The Grammar School with about 600 boys. The girls' high school opened in 1928. From April 1974 it was administered by Staffordshire County Council.

Another similar nearby school was the Dovecliff Grammar School, formerly Burton Technical School, on St Mary's Drive in Horninglow, which became Wulfric Comprehensive School in 1975, then De Ferrers High School in 1985.

Comprehensive
In 1975 the Burton Grammar school was merged with the Burton on Trent Girls' High School and Ada Chadwick Secondary Modern School to become Abbot Beyne mixed Comprehensive School on Mill Hill Lane but it was a newly created school. Other than using the name of the founder of the Grammar School, Abbot Beyne and using the site in Winshill, it did not inherit any of the previous school's traditions or educational practices.  Pupils were no longer selected on ability.

Academic performance
The school achieves GCSE and A-level results around the England average, with the A-level results being slightly better than the GCSE results.

Sport
Abbot Beyne has an array of sporting facilities, including; two gymnasiums, rugby pitches, two athletic tracks, two football pitches and numerous tennis courts.

Alumni

The Grammar School
Dr Norman Allen CB, President from 1961-2 of the Institute of Metallurgists
Michael Thomas Bass, brewer
Prof Alec Beardmore, Professor of Genetics from 1966–97 at Swansea University
Prof Adrian Brown, Professor of Biology and Chemistry of Fermentation from 1899–1919 at the University of Birmingham
Bernard Crump, Chief Executive since 2005 of the NHS Institute for Innovation and Improvement
Sir Cecil Dannatt OBE MC, Professor of Electrical Engineering from 1940–4 at the University of Birmingham
Sir Oscar de Ville CBE, Chairman from 1987-91 of Meyer International (bought by Saint-Gobain in 2000)
Brian Hackett, Professor of Landscape Architecture from 1967–77 at Newcastle University, and President from 1967-9 of the Institute of Landscape Architects (now the Landscape Institute)
Anthony Hardy (b. 1951), serial killer in London
Paul Harvey (artist)
Sir Francis Ley
Alfred Newbould, Liberal MP from 1919-22 for Leyton West
Bob Plant MC
Prof Roy Pryce, Director from 1983-90 of the Federal Trust for Education and Research
Prof. Hugh Richmond, Professor of English, University of California, Berkeley, 1957–1994.
Edward Wightman (d.1612), nontrinitarian Baptist pastor, last person burnt at the stake for heresy in England
Alastair Yates, former BBC & Sky News journalist

The Comprehensive School
Paddy Considine, actor
Jane Furniss, Chief Executive since 2006 of the Independent Police Complaints Commission (IPCC)
Dr Pamela Horn, author
Hanna Bladon, victim in 2017 Jerusalem Light Rail stabbing
James Draper - Poet

References

External links
Burton-upon-Trent: Education (British History Online)
Abbot Beyne School website
Abbot Beyne School prospectus
History of Burton Grammar School
Burton upon Trent Girls' High School Association
OFSTED report for Abbot Beyne School
BBC News review
Nation Institute of Fame UK
EduBase

News items
Teachers hurt in May 2010

Educational institutions established in the 1530s
Secondary schools in Staffordshire
Borough of East Staffordshire
Voluntary controlled schools in England